Wai Tsai or Wai Tsai Tsuen is a village in the Ngau Tam Mei, San Tin area of Yuen Long District, Hong Kong.

Administration
Wai Tsai is a recognized village under the New Territories Small House Policy.

References

Further reading

External links

 Delineation of area of existing village Wai Tsai (San Tin) for election of resident representative (2019 to 2022)

Villages in Yuen Long District, Hong Kong
San Tin